The Tucalota Hills are a low mountain range of the Peninsular Ranges System, in Riverside County, California.

Geography
They are located east of Lake Skinner reservoir, southwest of Hemet, northeast of Temecula.

Diamond Valley reservoir fills a basin in their northwestern area.

The San Jacinto Mountains are to the northeast, and Santa Ana Mountains to the west.

See also

References

External links
 

Hills of California
Peninsular Ranges
Mountain ranges of Riverside County, California
Hemet, California